Elliot Hubbard (born 19 September 1973) is a Bermudian former cyclist. He competed in the men's individual road race at the 1996 Summer Olympics.

References

External links
 

1973 births
Living people
Bermudian male cyclists
Olympic cyclists of Bermuda
Cyclists at the 1996 Summer Olympics
Place of birth missing (living people)